The Fortress of São João da Barra do Rio de Janeiro, commonly known as the Fortress of São João or São João Fort, is a 16th-century star fort in the present-day Urca neighborhood of Rio de Janeiro, erected by Estácio de Sá to protect Guanabara Bay from French invasion.

History 
The original fort was built in 1565 under King Sebastian of Portugal. An expanded and improved structure was put into service in 1618, consisting of four batteries (São José, São Martinho, São Teodósio, and São Diogo). Its armaments were greatly reduced, and not manned, during Brazil's regency period, but emperor Pedro II ordered the fort completely renovated in 1872, and it was equipped with a complement of guns, bunkers, and batteries, including fifteen Whitworth cannons. It was manned as a coastal artillery installation until 1991.

In 1930, the Brazilian Army's Centro Militar de Educação Física (created in 1922) was transferred to the Fortaleza de São João.

References

External links
Map of the Situation of the Three Main Fortresses on the Inlet Entrance of Rio de Janeiro... is a map from 1764 including Fortaleza de São João and two other forts. 

Sao Joao
Buildings and structures in Rio de Janeiro (city)
Portuguese colonial architecture in Brazil